Jade Eshete (born January 9, 1985) is an American television and film actress. She starred on the BBC America series Dirk Gently's Holistic Detective Agency.

Early life 
Jade Eshete was born to Guyanese and Ethiopian parents in Brooklyn, New York. While obtaining her structural engineering degree from The City College of New York, she volunteered with National Dance Institute helping inner city youth learn dance.

Career 
Upon graduation, Eshete started her professional career in commercial print modeling for brands including L'Oreal Paris, Marshalls, QVC, Essence Magazine, Dark & Lovely and SoftSheen-Carson. She then transitioned into featured roles on stage, including the character Squeak in the national tour of the musical The Color Purple, directed by Gary Griffin. She was also a featured singer in the international tour of Hair, directed by Diane Paulus.

She also appeared in the short films 2015 Brooklove and the 2017 Ache.

On television, Eshete has been seen in episodes of HBO's 2012 series High Maintenance, Hulu's 2014 series Deadbeat, NBC's 2016  series Shades of Blue and Showtime's Billions. Most notably she has starred as Farah Black in the BBC America science-fiction detective 2016 series Dirk Gently's Holistic Detective Agency.

Filmography

Film

Television

References

External links

Living people
People from Brooklyn
Actresses from New York City
American people of Ethiopian descent
American people of Guyanese descent
American television actresses
1985 births
21st-century American women